MVE or mve may refer to:

 Marwari language, spoken in India (by ISO 639 code)
 Montevideo-Chippewa County Airport, Minnesota, USA (by IATA code)
 Murray Valley Encephalitis
 MVE, Artist from The Netherlands